Borken II is an electoral constituency (German: Wahlkreis) represented in the Bundestag. It elects one member via first-past-the-post voting. Under the current constituency numbering system, it is designated as constituency 126. It is located in northern North Rhine-Westphalia, comprising the western and central part of the Borken district.

Borken II was created for the inaugural 1949 federal election. Since 2021, it has been represented by Anne König of the Christian Democratic Union (CDU).

Geography
Borken II is located in northern North Rhine-Westphalia. As of the 2021 federal election, it comprises the entirety of the Borken district excluding the municipalities of Ahaus, Gronau, Heek, Legden, and Schöppingen.

History
Borken II was created in 1949, then known as Borken – Bocholt – Ahaus. From 1965 through 1976, it was named Ahaus – Bocholt. From 1980 through 1987, it was named Borken. It acquired its current name in the 1990 election. In the 1949 election, it was North Rhine-Westphalia constituency 35 in the numbering system. From 1953 through 1961, it was number 94. From 1965 through 1976, it was number 92. From 1980 through 1998, it was number 96. From 2002 through 2009, it was number 127. Since 2013, it has been number 126.

Originally, the constituency comprised the districts of Borken and Ahaus and the independent city of Bocholt. In the 1980 through 1987 elections, it was coterminous with the district of Borken. From 1990 through 1998, it comprised the municipalities of Ahaus, Bocholt, Borken, Gescher, Gronau, Heek, Isselburg, Legden, Rhede, Schöppingen, Stadtlohn, Südlohn, Velen, and Vreden from Borken district. It acquired its current borders in the 2002 election.

Members
The constituency has been held continuously by the Christian Democratic Union (CDU) since its creation. It was first represented by Theodor Blank from 1949 to 1969. Hermann Josef Unland then served as representative from 1969 to 1990. Elke Wülfing served from 1990 to 2005. Johannes Röring was elected in 2005, and re-elected in 2009, 2013, and 2017. He was succeeded by Anne König in 2021.

Election results

2021 election

2017 election

2013 election

2009 election

References

Federal electoral districts in North Rhine-Westphalia
1949 establishments in West Germany
Constituencies established in 1949
Borken (district)